Warrant Officer Class 1 Barry Johnson, GC (born 25 January 1952) is a former British Army soldier of the Royal Army Ordnance Corps who was awarded the George Cross for his gallantry in defusing a mortar bomb in Derry, Northern Ireland on 7 October 1989. The device detonated, causing him serious injury. Notice of his award appeared in the London Gazette on 6 November 1990.

Early life
He was born on 25 January 1952 in London and entered the Army Apprentices College as an Ammunition Technician in 1967.

Citation
What follows is the full text of the official citation for Johnson's George Cross as it appeared in the London Gazette:

Honours
<div class="center">

References

1952 births
Royal Army Ordnance Corps soldiers
British recipients of the George Cross
Living people
Military personnel from London
Bomb disposal personnel
British military personnel of The Troubles (Northern Ireland)